Die Photographische Sammlung is the photography museum of the , the cultural foundation of the  bank in Cologne, Germany. The full name is usually stylized Die Photographische Sammlung/SK Stiftung Kultur. The collection includes an archive of the photographs of August Sander.

History 

The museum was founded in 1992 after the SK Stiftung Kultur bought the archive of the photographs of August Sander. from Gerd Sander, August Sander's grandson.

On February 10, 2022, claiming fair use, August's great-grandson Julian Sander released the entire archive online as almost free (other than a small admin fee) non fungible tokens (NFT) made available via the OpenSea NFT marketplace. SK Stiftung Kultur issued a copyright infringement notice to OpenSea, stating that it held the copyright of the archive until 2032.

Activities 

The museum sometimes lends the photographs from the original archive for exhibits about Sander, his work and that of his contemporaries. The museum was one of the organizers of the Bernd & Hila Becher show at the Met Museum in 2022.

The collection includes over 30,000 photographs from around the world. In 2021, the museum published From Becher to Blume:Photographs from the Garnatz Collection and Die Photographische Sammlung-SK Stiftung Kultur, in Dialogue.

See also 
 Judith Joy Ross
 Tata Ronkholz
 Rosalind Fox Solomon
 Henry Wessel Jr.

References 

1992 establishments in Germany
Museums in Cologne
Photography museums and galleries